The Pierce Manse is a historic house museum located in Concord, New Hampshire. It was the home of the 14th president of the United States, Franklin Pierce, who lived there from 1842 to 1848, not long before his presidency.

Overview

Franklin Pierce and his wife Jane Pierce moved here after she persuaded him to resign his seat in the United States Senate and leave Washington, D.C. They owned the home from 1842 to 1848. Pierce resumed his law practice and also served as district attorney and chairman of the Democratic Party. During this time, Pierce advocated on behalf of James K. Polk's campaign for the presidency. Polk appointed Pierce U.S. Attorney for the State of New Hampshire as a reward in 1845.

In May 1845, Pierce took a trip away from home to visit his friend Nathaniel Hawthorne and his wife Sophia Peabody, who were then living in The Old Manse in Concord, Massachusetts, along with their Bowdoin College friend Horatio Bridge. Peabody recalled the meeting fondly and recorded her first impression of Pierce as "loveliness and truth of character and natural refinement." In 1846, Polk offered Pierce the United States Attorney General position, which Pierce declined on account of his wife's health. That year, with the outbreak of the Mexican–American War, Pierce enlisted as a private and was soon promoted to brigadier general. After an accident resulted in injury during the Battle of Contreras, he resigned from the Army by 1848.

In 1971 the building was threatened with demolition as part of an urban renewal project. Locals created the "Pierce Brigade", an organization to raise funds to purchase and save the home. Due to their efforts, the building was moved from Montgomery Street in Concord to its present location at 14 Horseshoe Pond Lane (in 1971 known as Penacook Street). It was opened to the public in 1974.

The home is available for guided tours from mid-June to October. It continues to be operated by the Pierce Brigade.

See also
Franklin Pierce Homestead, an earlier home of Franklin Pierce
Franklin Pierce House (South Main Street, Concord, New Hampshire), where Pierce died
 List of residences of presidents of the United States
List of National Historic Landmarks in New Hampshire
New Hampshire Historical Marker No. 125: The Pierce Manse

References

External links

 Pierce Manse official site
"Life Portrait of Franklin Pierce", from C-SPAN's American Presidents: Life Portraits, broadcast from the Pierce Manse, June 14, 1999

Franklin Pierce family residences
Historic house museums in New Hampshire
Houses on the National Register of Historic Places in New Hampshire
Houses in Concord, New Hampshire
Presidential homes in the United States
Museums in Merrimack County, New Hampshire
Biographical museums in New Hampshire
Presidential museums in the United States
Tourist attractions in Concord, New Hampshire
Historic district contributing properties in New Hampshire
National Register of Historic Places in Concord, New Hampshire